Rob Milligan may refer to:

 Rob Milligan (rugby union) (born 1990), rugby union player
 Rob Milligan (politician) (born 1971), politician in Ontario, Canada

See also 
 Robert Milligan (disambiguation)